Baie-Johan-Beetz is a municipality and village in the Côte-Nord region of the province of Quebec in Canada, located some  east of Havre-Saint-Pierre. It has the lowest population of all incorporated places in the Côte-Nord region.

History

Joseph Tanguay, originally from Berthier, settled at the Little Watshishou River in 1854. 
Tanguay and his sons fished mostly for salmon on the Piashti, Corneille, Petite Watshishou, Watshishou and Quetachou rivers.
In 1862 Tanguay moved to Baie Piashti.
Other early settlers came from the Magdalen Islands. The place was originally identified as "Piastre Bay", from the Innu expression piashite-pets, meaning "there where the water passes over/on top", or possibly originating from the word piashtibé, meaning "dry bay" or "where the water rises", which is a reference to the local bay that during low tide runs dry.

The bay's name was spelled in a variety of ways, including Piashti Bay, Pillage Bay, Baie-de-Pillage, Piastibe, Piashte Bay, and Piestebé. Perhaps for this reason, its residents expressed a desire to change the village's name to Baie-Johan-Beetz in 1910. Johan Beetz (1874-1949) was a Belgian naturalist, who lived in the Bay from 1897 to 1922. He had moved there to breed fur animals, particularly foxes, and built a luxurious manor that residents today call le château (the castle). The bay was renamed in 1914, but the name was not officially adopted until 1965 when the place was incorporated.

In 1996, Highway 138 was extended to Baie-Johan-Beetz, linking it to the municipality of Havre-Saint-Pierre and thereby breaking its isolation.

Demographics

Population

Language

Climate

Transports
The city is served by the Baie-Johan-Beetz Seaplane Base (SPB) .

See also
List of municipalities in Quebec

References

Sources

Municipalities in Quebec
Incorporated places in Côte-Nord